The 1983 King Cup was the 25th season of the knockout competition since its establishment in 1956. Al-Hilal were the defending champions, but they were eliminated by Al-Ahli in the semi-finals. 

Al-Ahli defeated Al-Ettifaq in the final to win their 10th title.

Bracket

Source: Al-Jazirah

Round of 32
The matches of the Round of 32 were played on 14 and 15 April 1983.

Round of 16
The Round of 16 matches were held on 21 and 22 April 1983.

Quarter-finals
The Quarter-final matches were held on 28 and 29 April 1983.

Semi-finals
The four winners of the quarter-finals progressed to the semi-finals. The semi-finals were played on 5 and 6 May 1983. All times are local, AST (UTC+3).

Final
The final was played between Al-Ettifaq and Al-Ahli in the Youth Welfare Stadium in Riyadh. Al-Ahli were appearing in their 12th final while Al-Ettifaq were appearing in their fourth the final. This final was a repeat of the 1965 final which ended in a win for Al-Ahli.

Top goalscorers

References

1983
Saudi Arabia
Cup